The women's long jump event  at the 1978 European Athletics Indoor Championships was held on 11 March in Milan.

Results

References

Long jump at the European Athletics Indoor Championships
Long
Euro